is a Japanese economist and a professor at the University of Tokyo.

Career
He received a B.A. from University of Tokyo in 2003 and a Ph.D. from Harvard University in 2008.

Fellowships, Awards
 2008–2011, Fellow, VCASI.
 2013–2015, Sloan Research Fellow.
 2014–present, SIEPR Fellow.
 2015–present, Economic Theory Fellow.
 2016, Social Choice and Welfare Prize.
 2021, Nakahara Prize

Published works

Papers

References

External links
 Fuhito Kojima - Sites - Google
 Faculty profile at Stanford University
 

1979 births
Living people
Japanese economists
21st-century American economists
University of Tokyo alumni
Harvard University alumni
Columbia University faculty
Stanford University Department of Economics faculty
Game theorists
Japanese expatriates in the United States

Fellows of the Econometric Society